Stergusa is a genus of jumping spiders that was first described by Eugène Louis Simon in 1889.

Species
 it contains five species, found only in Asia and on New Caledonia:
Stergusa aurata Simon, 1902 – Sri Lanka
Stergusa aurichalcea Simon, 1902 – Sri Lanka
Stergusa improbula Simon, 1889 (type) – New Caledonia
Stergusa incerta Prószyński & Deeleman-Reinhold, 2010 – Indonesia (Sumbawa)
Stergusa stelligera Simon, 1902 – Sri Lanka

References

Salticidae genera
Salticidae
Spiders of Asia